Wayne Barrow (born April 2, 1965) is an American film producer, talent manager and businessman. He is the founder and co-owner with Mark Pitts of ByStorm Entertainment. He currently serves as the CEO of Barrow Films CEO of Brooklyns Finest, Inc, CEO of StormTroopers Entertainment and Vice Chairman of The Christopher Wallace Memorial Foundation.

Career
Barrow began his career as a hospital corpsman in the United States Navy as a petty officer. After serving 8 years in the Navy, Barrow began a new career in the music business by teaming up with Mark Pitts, where he managed business operations of his company, Mark Pitts Management. Their clients included Changing Faces, Shyne, Queen Pen, LooN, NAS and the Notorious B.I.G. He secured a deal with EMI Publishing with Aqil Davidson of Wreckx-N-Effect.

In 1998, he became the president of Bystorm Entertainment, a record label that he founded with Mark Pitts, to sign up-and-coming artists. He signed rapper Tracey Lee and launched his debut album, “Many Faces”, with the Universal Records which gave the initial success to the company. The album sold 500,000 copies. They entered into a joint venture with RCA Records and signed Miguel, Mali-Music, Ro-James, and J.Cole.

Barrow has also produced movies, including Notorious, Blue, Kicks, BIGGIE I Got A Story To Tell and City Of Lies. During his career, he has managed the recording artists such as Wreckx-N-Effect, J.Cole, Miguel, Loon, Shyne, Ro-James, Kardinal Offishall, Biggie Smalls and The Notorious B.I.G.

Discography

References

Living people
1965 births
American talent agents
American film producers